Sibghatullah Shah Rashdi III, also known as Raja Saein, the eighth Pir Pagaro, (born 14 February 1956) is a Pakistani politician who has served as a member of Provincial Assembly of Sindh.

Early life and career 
He is the eldest son of 7th Pir Pagaro Syed Shah Mardan Shah-II who died on 10 January 2012. He is 8th Pir Pagaro since 12 January 2012. He is currently the President of the Pakistan Muslim League (F) and the leader of the Grand Democratic Alliance.

Political career
He was the Chairman of the District Council of Khairpur in 1983. He has been elected three times to the Sindh Assembly and has been a Provincial Minister. He became the President of the Pakistan Muslim League (F) after the death of his father Syed Shah Mardan Shah-II in 2012. Before the general election 2013 on 23 October 2017, he participated in forming the Grand Democratic Alliance (GDA) with other political parties in Sindh. He announced a manifesto to provide Education Health and Justice to the people.

See also

 Hurs

References

Living people
1956 births
Pakistan Muslim League (F) politicians
Pakistani religious leaders
Pakistani Sufis
Politicians from Karachi
Sindh MPAs 1985–1988
Sindh MPAs 1988–1990
Sindh MPAs 1990–1993
Sindh MPAs 1993–1996
Sindh MPAs 1997–1999
Pagara family